The chocolate chub (Squalius carinus) is a species of freshwater fish in the family Cyprinidae. The species is endemic to the Lake Isikli basin in Turkey.

References

Fish described in 2011
Squalius